Fateh Achour (born 15 August 1994) is an Algerian footballer who plays for ASO Chlef in the Algerian Ligue Professionnelle 1.

Career
In 2018, Achour signed a two-year contract with USM Bel Abbès.

In 2020, he signed a two-year contract with USM Alger.

References

External links
 

Living people
1994 births
Algerian footballers
Association football defenders
USM Alger players
USM Bel Abbès players
GC Mascara players
21st-century Algerian people